The short-headed sculpin (Cottinella boulengeri) iray-finned fish belonging to the family Cottidae, the typical sculpins. This species is endemic to Lake Baikal in Russia. This species is the only known member of its genus.

References

Abyssocottinae
Monotypic fish genera
Fish of Lake Baikal
Fish described in 1906
Taxa named by Lev Berg